Quinn Chapel AME Church is a historic African Methodist Episcopal Church building located at 227 Bowen Street in the Carondelet section of St. Louis, Missouri, in the United States. Built in 1869 as the North Public Market, it was acquired by the church in 1880. 
On October 16, 1974, it was added to the National Register of Historic Places.
Its current pastor is Rev. Lori K. Beason.

History
The Carondelet AME Church, which had been founded in 1845, bought the North Public Market in 1880 from the city of St. Louis and converted it for use as a church. The market, built in 1869 by the then city of Carondolet, had passed to the city of St. Louis in 1870 when it annexed Carondolet. In 1882 the church's name was changed to Quinn Chapel in memory of William Paul Quinn, the fourth bishop of the AME Church.

Current use
Quinn Chapel is still an active AME Church. Its current pastor is the Rev. Lori K. Beason.

See also
 List of Registered Historic Places in St. Louis County, Missouri

References

External links
 Preservation Issues listing for Quinn Chapel
 Waymark listing for Quinn Chapel A.M.E. Church - St. Louis, Missouri
 Archiplanet listing for Quinn Chapel AME Church
 History of churches in Carondelet

African-American history in St. Louis
Churches on the National Register of Historic Places in Missouri
African Methodist Episcopal churches in Missouri
Churches in St. Louis
National Register of Historic Places in St. Louis
Buildings and structures in St. Louis
1880 establishments in Missouri